The 1966 PGA Tour season was played from January 6 to November 27. The season consisted of 40 official money events. Billy Casper won the most tournaments, four, and there were six first-time winners. Casper was the leading money winner with earnings of $121,945. He was voted the PGA Player of the Year and also won the Vardon Trophy for the lowest scoring average.

Schedule
The following table lists official events during the 1966 season.

Unofficial events
The following events were sanctioned by the PGA Tour, but did not carry official money, nor were wins official.

Money leaders
The money list was based on prize money won during the season, calculated in U.S. dollars.

Awards

Notes

References

External links
PGA Tour official site

PGA Tour seasons
PGA Tour